Scott Puodziunas (born 9 November 1989) is an Australian tennis player.

Puodziunas has a career high ATP singles ranking of 891 achieved on 23 October 2017. He also has a career high ATP doubles ranking of 171 achieved on 13 January 2020.

Puodziunas made his ATP main draw debut at the 2021 Great Ocean Road Open in the doubles draw partnering Calum Puttergill.

Challenger and Futures Finals

Doubles 28 (14–14)

References

External links

1989 births
Living people
Australian male tennis players
Tennis players from Brisbane